Alhassan is a surname. Notable people with the surname include:

Masahudu Alhassan (born 1992), Ghanaian international full-back
Alhassan Wakaso (born 1992), Ghanaian midfielder
Kalif Alhassan (born 1990), Ghanaian winger
Karim Alhassan (born 1991), Ghanaian defender
Moro Alhassan (born 1994), Ghanaian midfielder
Mohammed Alhassan (born 1984), Ghanaian goalkeeper
George Alhassan (born 1955), Ghanaian forward
George Alhassan (born 1941), former Ghanaian football player
Abdul Razak Alhassan (born 1985), a Ghanaian mixed-martial artist